Mount Kurchatov is a peak,  high, rising from the base of Sponskaftet Spur in the Humboldt Mountains of Queen Maud Land, Antarctica. It was discovered and plotted from air photos by the Third German Antarctic Expedition, 1938–39, and mapped from air photos and surveys by the Sixth Norwegian Antarctic Expedition, 1956–60. It was remapped by the Soviet Antarctic Expedition, 1960–61, and named after Soviet academician I.V. Kurchatov.

References

Mountains of Queen Maud Land
Humboldt Mountains (Antarctica)